"Sunrise, Sunset" is a song from the musical Fiddler on the Roof written in 1964 by composer Jerry Bock and lyricist Sheldon Harnick.

Production
Lyricist Sheldon Harnick said:

The album Sheldon Harnick: Hidden Treasures (1949-2013) features the demo recording of "Sunrise, Sunset" featuring Harnick, accompanied by composer Jerry Bock. Harnick said "This CD set is supposed to be the unknown songs, and the two men who created it, Bill Rudman (ph) and Ken Bloom (ph), when they said they wanted to use "Sunrise, Sunset," I said but that's a very familiar song. They said not with you singing it."

Synopsis
This song is performed at the wedding of Tzeitel, Tevye and Golde's eldest daughter. The two parents sing about how they can't believe their daughter and her groom have grown up, while Hodel and Perchik sing about whether there may be a wedding in the nearby future for them.

Critical reception
The Irish Times said the song has a "hypnotic chorus". AllMusic deemed it one of the film's "famous and now-standard songs". Splash Magazine named it one of the musical's "big Broadway numbers". The Style Weekly critic said the song, along with Tradition, had "infectious strains". The Des Moines Register noted that the musical "melts into bittersweetness" at this song. The Northampton Chronicle critic opined that it was "poignant". Virtual Shropshire's critic wrote that the song "wrings the heart ... as Tevye's daughters approach marrying age." Register Citizen described the song as a "heartbreaking parental cry to slow down the years, to keep their children young: 'Wasn't it yesterday when they were small?'" AZ Central noted the song was "haunting and emotional". Blue Coupe wrote "Musically, the scene's centerpiece is the classic 'Sunrise, Sunset'".

Recordings
Anthony Newley and Linda Hibberd (1995) - Fiddler on the Roof [1995 Studio Cast]
Bing Crosby recorded the song for his 1972 album Bing 'n' Basie.
Johnny Hartman recorded the song for his 1964 album The voice that is
Eddie Fisher - included in his album Eddie Fisher Today! (1965) 
Harry James released a version in 1967 on his album Our Leader! (Dot DLP 3801 and DLP 25801).
Jerry Vale - for his album Great Moments on Broadway (1966)
Perry Como - included in his album Look to Your Heart (1968)
Robert Goulet - for his album On Broadway (1965)
Miriam Makeba on the album RCA LSP3512
Roger Whittaker - for his album This Is Roger Whittaker (1969)
Bobby Vinton - for his album Bobby Vinton Sings the Newest Hits (1967)
Steve Lawrence and Eydie Gormé - included in their album Together on Broadway (1967)
Topol and Miriam Karlin - Fiddler on the Roof (Original London Cast) (1969)
Vera Lynn - included in the album Hits of the 60's - My Way (1970)
John Gary - RCA Victor 45 RPM single 47-8479 (1964)
 Juan Pablo Di Pace - Dark Horse Label Digital Single (2018)

As a wedding song
"Sunrise, Sunset" is often played at weddings.  In 2011 Sheldon Harnick wrote two versions of the song, suitable for same-sex weddings, with minor word changes. For example, for male couples, changes include "When did they grow to be so handsome".

References

1964 songs
Songs from Fiddler on the Roof
Songs written by Sheldon Harnick
Songs written by Jerry Bock